Rhynchentedon is a genus of hymenopteran insects of the family Eulophidae.

References

Eulophidae